Orlovka is a rural locality (a selo) in Orlovsky Selsoviet of Konstantinovsky District, Amur Oblast, Russia. The population was 281 as of 2018. There are 6 streets.

Geography 
Orlovka is located on the left bank of the Amur River, 12 km southeast of Konstantinovka (the district's administrative centre) by road. Konstantinovka is the nearest rural locality.

References 

Rural localities in Konstantinovsky District